Centrosomal protein of 76 kDa, also known as CEP76, is a protein that in humans is encoded by the CEP76 gene.

References

External links

Further reading

Centrosome